Shuicheng Road is a station on Line 10 of the Shanghai Metro, located in Changning District. It opened on 10 April 2010.

Places nearby
Xijiao Sports Center
Star Live Plaza

References

Railway stations in Shanghai
Line 10, Shanghai Metro
Shanghai Metro stations in Changning District
Railway stations in China opened in 2010